The Adelaide Strikers (WBBL) are an Australian women's Twenty20 cricket team based in North Adelaide, South Australia. They compete in the Women's Big Bash League, and won their first championship in WBBL08.

History

Formation 
One of eight founding WBBL teams, the Adelaide Strikers are aligned with the men's team of the same name. At the official WBBL launch on 10 July 2015, Megan Schutt was unveiled as the team's first-ever player signing. Andrea McCauley was appointed as the Strikers' inaugural coach, while Lauren Ebsary became the team's inaugural captain.

The Strikers played their first match on 12 December at Aurora Stadium against the Hobart Hurricanes, losing by two runs. Their first win came on 20 December at Allan Border Field against the Sydney Thunder, chasing down a target of 149 runs with six wickets in hand and six balls to spare.

Rivalries

Perth Scorchers 
In the league's early years, the Strikers and the Perth Scorchers experienced several instances of senior members switching allegiances:
 Inaugural Strikers captain Lauren Ebsary joined the Scorchers after just one season.
 Former Scorchers captain Suzie Bates moved to the Strikers ahead of WBBL|03 and became the first player to lead two WBBL clubs.
 After scoring the most runs for Perth throughout WBBL|01, Charlotte Edwards transferred to Adelaide in her final year of cricket. The following season, Edwards assumed an assistant coaching role for the Strikers.
 Ahead of WBBL|06, former Adelaide all-rounder Shelley Nitschke was appointed to the position of head coach for the Scorchers.

Noteworthy matches between the two teams include:
 13 January 2018, Traeger Park: In a match reduced to 16 overs per side due to a rain delay, the Scorchers could only muster a first innings score of 9/87. In the run chase, Suzie Bates played a lone hand of 49 not out to help the Strikers win by six wickets with one ball to spare.
 9 November 2019, Karen Rolton Oval: An innings of 80 runs from 58 deliveries by Amy Jones helped Perth post a total of 3/173. Despite a slow start to the run chase, Adelaide finished strongly with Bridget Patterson scoring 60 off 32 balls. However, Heather Graham conceded just a single off the final ball to give the Scorchers a two-run win.
 7 December 2019, Allan Border Field: In the WBBL|05 semi-finals, the Strikers comfortably reached the required total of 127 with eight wickets in hand and eleven balls remaining to eliminate the Scorchers from the tournament.

Brisbane Heat 
Noteworthy matches between the Strikers and the Brisbane Heat include:
 21 January 2017, The Gabba: Chasing a modest total of 6/127, the Strikers required three runs for victory with two balls remaining. Brisbane medium-pacer Deandra Dottin then bowled Tegan McPharlin before conceding two runs off the final delivery to force a tie. In the resulting super over, Dottin–who had earlier scored 51 runs with the bat–capped off a dominant all-round performance by taking two wickets and limiting Adelaide to just four runs. Beth Mooney scored the winning runs to secure the Heat's first finals appearance.
 8 December 2019, Allan Border Field: In the WBBL|05 final, the Heat gained early ascendancy through quick bowler Georgia Prestwidge, who dismissed Player of the Tournament Sophie Devine for just five. A "superb" knock of 55 runs from 33 balls by Amanda-Jade Wellington helped the Strikers to recover to a competitive score of 7/161. The match swung heavily toward Brisbane's favour in the fifth over of the run chase when Sammy-Jo Johnson hit four sixes against the bowling of Devine, though Johnson would be out caught-and-bowled on the last ball of the over. When Devine returned to bowl the eleventh over of the innings, Heat batter Jess Jonassen was dropped by Wellington at extra cover. Jonassen then scored a boundary from each of the next three deliveries she faced, taking Brisbane's required scoring rate down to less than a run a ball. The Heat went on to win with six wickets in hand and eleven balls remaining, claiming their second consecutive championship. For her contribution of 56 not out, Beth Mooney was named Player of the Final.

Captaincy records

There have been five captains in the Strikers' history, including matches featuring an acting captain.

Source:

Season summaries

Home grounds

Players

Current squad

Australian representatives
 The following is a list of cricketers who have played for the Strikers after making their debut in the national women's team (the period they spent as both a Strikers squad member and an Australian-capped player is in brackets):

Overseas marquees

Associate rookies

Statistics and awards

Team stats
Champions: 1 – WBBL08 
Runners-up: 2 – WBBL05, WBBL07
Minor premiers: 0
 Win–loss record:

 Highest score in an innings: 5/189 (20 overs) vs Hobart Hurricanes, 8 January 2019
 Highest successful chase:
 2/155 (14.5 overs) vs Hobart Hurricanes, 18 November 2022
 4/156 (19.4 overs) vs Brisbane Heat, 24 November 2022
 Lowest successful defence: 7/107 (20 overs) vs Perth Scorchers, 14 January 2018
 Largest victory:
 Batting first: 83 runs vs Hobart Hurricanes, 10 December 2017
 Batting second: 55 balls remaining vs Melbourne Renegades, 25 November 2021
 Longest winning streak: 6 matches
 Longest losing streak: 8 matches

Source:

Individual stats
 Most runs: Sophie Devine – 2,174
 Highest score in an innings: Sophie Devine – 103* (48) vs Hobart Hurricanes, 26 December 2016
 Highest partnership: Sophie Devine and Bridget Patterson – 131 vs Melbourne Stars, 23 December 2018
 Most wickets: Amanda-Jade Wellington – 126
 Best bowling figures in an innings: Megan Schutt – 6/19 (3.3 overs) vs Sydney Thunder, 20 November 2022
 Hat-tricks taken: Darcie Brown vs Brisbane Heat, 24 October 2021
 Most catches (fielder): Bridget Patterson – 52
 Most dismissals (wicket-keeper): Tegan McPharlin – 91 (51 catches, 40 stumpings)

Source:

Individual awards
 Player of the Match:
 Sophie Devine – 15
 Tahlia McGrath – 8
 Darcie Brown, Sarah Coyte, Katie Mack, Amanda-Jade Wellington – 4 each
 Suzie Bates,  Bridget Patterson, Megan Schutt, Laura Wolvaardt – 3 each
 Madeline Penna – 2
 Deandra Dottin, Lauren Ebsary, Tegan McPharlin, Alex Price, Tabatha Saville, Sarah Taylor, Stafanie Taylor  – 1 each
 WBBL Player of the Tournament: Sophie Devine – WBBL05
 WBBL Team of the Tournament:
Sophie Devine (4) – WBBL02, WBBL03, WBBL04, WBBL05
 Darcie Brown (2) – WBBL06, WBBL07
 Megan Schutt (2) – WBBL|05, WBBL08
Amanda-Jade Wellington (2) – WBBL|07, WBBL|08
 Sarah Coyte – WBBL|06
Tahlia McGrath – WBBL|07
 WBBL Young Gun Award: Darcie Brown – WBBL06

Sponsors

See also

South Australian Cricket Association
South Australian Scorpions

References

Notes

External links

 
Women's Big Bash League teams
Cricket in South Australia
Cricket clubs established in 2015
2015 establishments in Australia
Sporting clubs in Adelaide